Littoraria angulifera or the mangrove periwinkle is a species of sea snail, a marine gastropod mollusc in the family Littorinidae, the winkles.

Description 

The maximum recorded shell length is 41 mm. The shell usually has six whorls, the large first one occupying half the length of the snail. The color varies from slaty-brown through reddish brown to orange, dull yellow and off white. The smaller whorls have white spots near their edges and also some darker streaks which fuse together on the largest whorl.

Distribution and habitat 
This species occurs in the Caribbean Sea and the western Atlantic Ocean from Florida south to Brazil. It is also found in the eastern Atlantic between Senegal and Angola. It lives mainly above sea level on the branches and prop roots of the red mangrove (Rhizophora mangle).

Biology
Littoraria angulifera is a herbivore and browses on fungi and algae growing on the mangroves.

Littoraria angulifera is ovoviviparous. Fertilized eggs are brooded inside the periwinkle and the veliger larvae are then released and become planktonic. After about 9 weeks these develop into pediveliger larvae which undergo metamorphosis and settle.

Human use 
Littoraria angulifera is used as a zootherapeutical product for the treatment of chesty cough and shortness of breath in traditional Brazilian medicine in the Northeast of Brazil.

References

 Reid, D.G. (1986). The littorinid molluscs of mangrove forests in the Indo-Pacific region. British Museum (Natural History), London
 Reid, D.G., Dyal, P., & Williams, S.T. (2010). Global diversification of mangrove fauna: a molecular phylogeny of Littoraria (Gastropoda: Littorinidae). Molecular Phylogenetics and Evolution. 55:185-201.

External links
 Lamarck, [J.-B. M. de. (1822). Histoire naturelle des animaux sans vertèbres. Tome septième. Paris: published by the Author, 711 pp.]
 Reid D.G. (1989) The comparative morphology, phylogeny and evolution of the gastropod family Littorinidae. Philosophical Transactions of the Royal Society B 324: 1-110
 Rosenberg, G.; Moretzsohn, F.; García, E. F. (2009). Gastropoda (Mollusca) of the Gulf of Mexico, Pp. 579–699 in: Felder, D.L. and D.K. Camp (eds.), Gulf of Mexico–Origins, Waters, and Biota. Texas A&M Press, College Station, Texas.

Littorinidae
Gastropods described in 1822